Ustad Ahmad Farooq (Pashto/;  − 15 January 2015), born Raja Muhammad Salman was a Pakistani Islamist militant who served as the deputy Emir of Al-Qaeda in the Indian Subcontinent, as well as Al-Qaeda's chief propagandist in Pakistan. It is believed he played a vital role in establishing Al-Qaeda in Pakistan after the September 11 attacks.

Early life 
Ahmad was born in Brooklyn between 1979 and 1981 to a Pakistani family. He was from Islamabad and received Sharia education at the International Islamic University, Islamabad. He joined Al-Qaeda and quickly rose to become its chief propagandist in Pakistan, releasing several videos, audio clips and writings perpetuating his views.

Death 
On 15 January 2015, Usama Mahmood, the spokesman for Al-Qaeda in Asia confirmed that Ustad Ahmad Farooq, had been killed in drone attacks conducted by the USA in the Lowara Mandi area of North Waziristan. The purpose of the drone strikes was mainly to kill Ahmed.

References 

Year of birth missing
2015 deaths